Jean-Charles de Coucy (born on 23 September 1746 at the Château d'Écordal, died on 9 March 1824 in Reims) was an ecclesiastic who was Archbishop of Reims.

Early life
Jean-Charles de Coucy was born on 23 September 1746 at the Château d'Écordal in the Rethelois (Ardennes). From the family of the lords of Coucy in Champagne, he was appointed Queen's Chaplain by Patent of January 28, 1776. Then he became canon of Reims. At the moment when the Revolution began, he was the Vicar-General of the Archbishop of Reims, Bishop de La Roche-Aymon.

Career
He was appointed bishop of La Rochelle by Louis XVI on 23 October 1789 and his appointment was confirmed by Pius VI on 14 December. Its seat was almost immediately suppressed, on 12 November 1789, by the Civil Constitution of the clergy. The dioceses are redrawn to correspond to the division of the departments, and that of La Rochelle is broken up. His monarchist convictions led him to exile in Spain. As early as 1791 he saw a difficult emigration. Based in Guadalajara, he organizes a mutual assistance fund between exiles2 and solicits the financial support of the Spanish upper clergy.

He refused his resignation to Pius VII in 1801, contributing by this refusal to elicit the schism of the Little Church of the Two Sèvres. Refractory to the civil constitution of the clergy, he also became refractory to the concordat. A significant part of his clergy followed him and returned to resistance. Letters from the exile, false or authentic, maintain the movement of resistance in the parishes. Dissenting parish priests are either displaced or tolerated. In 1803, on a report from Dupin, Prefect of the Deux-Sèvres, Bonaparte asked the King of Spain to arrest Coucy. He was then imprisoned and did not leave until 1807, at the instigation of Abbé Émery and Archbishop Fesch.

Returning to France in 1814, he assured his vicars general that he had not been the author of any letters since 1804. During the Hundred Days he accompanied King Louis XVIII to Ghent. In 1816 he finally gave his resignation to the king of the bishopric of La Rochelle and was appointed to the prestigious title of Archbishop of Reims on August 8, 1817, as a reward for his fidelity to the Bourbons. In 1819 he publicly disapproved of the movement of the Little Church which persists. He was created a peer of France on 31 October 1822. He died in Reims on 9 March 1824.

References

1746 births
1824 deaths
19th-century Roman Catholic archbishops in France
Archbishops of Reims